The Spanish Steps in Rome, Italy, climb a steep slope between the Piazza di Spagna at the base and Piazza Trinità dei Monti, dominated by the Trinità dei Monti church, at the top.

The monumental stairway of 135 steps was built with French diplomat Étienne Gueffier's bequeathed funds of 20,000 scudi, in 1723–1725, linking the Trinità dei Monti church under the patronage of the Bourbon kings of France, at the top of the steps, and the Spanish Embassy to the Holy See in the Palazzo Monaldeschi at the bottom of the steps. The stairway was designed by architects Francesco de Sanctis and Alessandro Specchi.

History

Generations of heated debate over how the steep, 29-meter slope to the church on a shoulder of the Pincio should be urbanized preceded the final execution. Archival drawings from the 1580s show that Pope Gregory XIII was interested in constructing a stair to the recently completed façade of the French church.

French diplomat to the Holy See  died in 1660, leaving part of his fortune for the construction of the stairs. The Roman-educated Cardinal Mazarin took a personal interest in the project and entrusted it to his agent in Rome, whose plan included an equestrian monument of Louis XIV of France, an ambitious intrusion that created a furore in papal Rome. Mazarin died in 1661, the pope in 1667, while Gueffier's will was successfully contested by a nephew who claimed half; so the project lay dormant until Pope Clement XI Albani renewed interest in it in the early 18th century.

A competition was held in 1717, which was won by Francesco de Sanctis, though Alessandro Specchi was long thought to have produced the winning entry. Little is known of the architect, who was favored by the French in the design process. His drawing was engraved by Girolamo Rossi in 1726, with a long dedication to Louis XV.

The solution is a gigantic inflation of some conventions of terraced garden stairs. The first such divided and symmetrical stairs were devised for the Belvedere Courtyard in the 1600s by Donato Bramante, while shaped and angled steps were introduced by Michelangelo in the vestibule to the Laurentian Library. The Bourbon fleur-de-lys and Innocent XIII's eagle and crown are carefully balanced in the sculptural details.

Mid-18th century writers Joseph de Lalande and Charles de Brosses noted that the steps were already in poor condition. They have been restored several times since, including from May to December 1995.

Sponsored by the Italian luxury brand Bulgari (which has its Italian flagship store in the nearby Via dei Condotti) a new renovation commenced on 8 October 2015, with the steps being reopened to the public on 21 September 2016. The restoration of the almost  of travertine stone, as well as brick, marble and plaster employed more than 80 people and cost €1.5 million.

Over the years several city administrations have tried to dissuade visitors from getting too comfortable on the steps, banning loitering and eating, but the ordinances have not been enforced. However, in July 2019 the administration of Mayor Virginia Raggi, as part of an attempt to get ill-mannered tourists to behave themselves in Rome, introduced more stringent ordinances designed to "guarantee decorum, security and legality". These regulations allow for fines of €250 for sitting down on the steps and up to €400 for dirtying or damaging the steps (including eating or pushing a pram up or down them).

Piazza di Spagna
In the Piazza di Spagna at the base is the Early Baroque fountain called Fontana della Barcaccia ("Fountain of the longboat"), built in 1627–29 and often credited to Pietro Bernini, father of a more famous son, Gian Lorenzo Bernini, who is recently said to have collaborated on the decoration. The elder Bernini had been the pope's architect for the Acqua Vergine, since 1623. According to a legend, Pope Urban VIII had the fountain installed after he had been impressed by a boat brought here by a flood of the Tiber.

In the piazza, at the corner on the right as one begins to climb the steps, is the house where English poet John Keats lived and died in 1821; it is now a museum dedicated to his memory, full of memorabilia of the English Romantic generation. On the same right side stands the 15th-century former cardinal Lorenzo Cybo de Mari's palace, now Ferrari di Valbona, a building altered in 1936 to designs by Marcello Piacentini, the main city planner during Fascism, with modern terraces perfectly in harmony with the surrounding baroque context.

Uses
At the top, the stairway ramp up the Pincio which is the Pincian Hill. The Villa Medici can be reached from the top of the steps.

During Christmas time a 19th-century criba manger is displayed on the first landing of the staircase. During Springtime, just before the anniversary of the foundation of Rome on 21 April, part of the steps are covered by pots of azaleas, up until early May. In modern times the Spanish Steps have included a small cut-flower market. The steps are not a place for eating lunch, being forbidden by Roman urban regulations, but they are usually crowded with people.

In literature 
The steps are featured in several literary works. Notable examples include:
 Numerous scenes in Alfred Bester's novel The Stars My Destination (1956)
 F. Scott Fitzgerald's novel Tender Is the Night (1933)
 Anthony Burgess' novel Abba Abba (1977)
 Tom Clancy's novel The Teeth of the Tiger (2003)

In media

In film and TV

The film Roman Holiday (1953), starring Audrey Hepburn and Gregory Peck featured the Spanish Steps.

In the 1963 Italian giallo film The Girl Who Knew Too Much, Nora witnesses a murder on the Spanish Steps.

The apartment that was the setting for The Roman Spring of Mrs. Stone (1961) is halfway up on the right. Bernardo Bertolucci's Besieged (1998) is also set in a house next to the Steps. The Steps were featured prominently in the film version of The Talented Mr. Ripley (1999), starring Matt Damon in the title role.

The Spanish Steps are mentioned (as the Spanish Stairs) in the first verse of the song When I Paint My Masterpiece (1971).

In the German television film Martha (1974), directed by Rainer Werner Fassbinder, the father of the masochistic title character (played by Margit Carstensen) dies while climbing the Spanish Steps.

In an episode of Everybody Loves Raymond (Season 5, Episode 1: Italy) which aired on October 2, 2000, Ray, Debra, Frank, and Marie climb the Spanish Steps during a family vacation in Rome.

An episode of the anime series Gunslinger Girl, entitled "Gelato (Ice Cream)," which first aired in 2003, features the protagonist by the Spanish Steps having her "reward" of ice cream after having completed a successful raid.

In the film To Rome with Love (2012), Hayley (Alison Pill) and Michelangelo Santoli (Flavio Parenti) met on the Spanish Steps.

The Spanish Steps were the setting of a 'Roadblock' task during The Amazing Race 24 (2014) in which contestants had to count the steps.

In the 2000 film “It Had To Be You”, it is the dream of the female lead, a school teacher who has never been out of NYC, to go to the Spanish Steps. She and her love interest imagine they are there while in a fountain in Central Park.

The Spanish Steps are featured in a scene in the film The Man From U.N.C.L.E. (2015), in which Illya (Armie Hammer), posing as a Russian architect, attempts to explain to Gaby (Alicia Vikander) that the Steps were actually made by a Russian architect.

Midway through the animated film Love Live! The School Idol Movie: Over the Rainbow (2019), the Steps were featured prominently as the site where the main idol group Aqours performed the main musical number of the film, "Hop? Stop? Nonstop!," during their overseas trip from Numazu, Japan to Rome.

In art 
On 16 January 2008, the Italian artist Graziano Cecchini covered the Spanish Steps with hundreds of thousands of multicolored plastic balls. He claimed it was done to raise international awareness of the situation of the Karen people in Myanmar, and as a protest against the living conditions of artists in Italy.

Local landmarks
Babington's tea room
Giorgio De Chirico House
Keats-Shelley Memorial House
Palazzo di Spagna

Notes

References

External links

Spanish Steps Rome The official website of the Association of Piazza di Spagna.
Spanish Steps Virtual reality movie and picture gallery
Detailed information with photos and 18th-century engravings by Giuseppe Vasi
The Spanish Steps 360 degree panorama - QuickTime VR.
Guided tour of Piazza di Spagna on romainteractive.com

Buildings and structures completed in 1725
Buildings and structures in Rome
Piazzas in Rome
Baroque architecture in Rome
Stairways
Tourist attractions in Rome
1725 establishments in the Papal States
1725 establishments in Italy
18th-century architecture in Italy